This is a list of school districts in Kentucky, which has two types of public school districts. The first type, county school districts, typically cover all or a large part of a county, and are generally styled "XXXX County (Public) Schools." The second type, "independent" districts, usually encompass cities or groups of cities. These have several different styles, but with one detail in common—"County" is nowhere to be found in the district name. All independent districts operate within a single county, with the following exceptions:

 Burgin, which mainly serves a single city in Mercer County, but also includes a very small part of Boyle County.
 Caverna, which serves two adjoining cities on separate sides of the boundary between Barren and Hart Counties
 Corbin, which serves a single city divided between Whitley and Knox Counties.
 Eminence, which mainly serves a single city in Henry County, but also includes a very small part of Shelby County.

All county districts operate schools from kindergarten through 12th grade. Most independent districts also do so; however, four do not operate high schools. These districts have agreements in place with one or more nearby school districts to allow their students to attend high schools in the other district(s). If a district does not operate high schools, the district(s) that its students will go to at that level will be noted below it.

The Department of Defense Education Activity (DoDEA) operates schools for military dependents at two major United States Army bases in Kentucky, Fort Campbell and Fort Knox. DoDEA has organized a Kentucky-specific district to administer the schools on those bases (although some of the Fort Campbell schools are physically located in Tennessee).

Multi-County

 Central Kentucky Education Cooperative
 Green River Regional Educational Cooperative
 KEDC Special Education Cooperative
Kentucky District, DoDEA Americas
 Kentucky Educational Development Corporation
 Kentucky Tech Schools (16 schools)

Barren County

Barren County Schools
Caverna Independent School District
Glasgow Independent Schools

Bell County

Bell County Schools
Middlesboro Independent Schools
Pineville Independent Schools

Boone County

Boone County Schools
Walton-Verona Independent Schools

Bourbon County

Bourbon County Schools
Paris Independent Schools

Boyd County

Ashland Independent School District
Boyd County Public Schools
Fairview Independent Schools

Boyle County

Boyle County Schools
Burgin Independent Schools (a tiny portion)
Danville Schools

Bracken County

Augusta Independent Schools
Bracken County Schools

Breathitt County

Breathitt County Schools
Jackson Independent School District

Breckinridge County

Breckinridge County Schools
Cloverport Independent Schools

Calloway County

Calloway County Schools
Murray Independent School District

Campbell County

Bellevue Independent Schools
Campbell County Schools
Dayton Independent Schools
Fort Thomas Independent Schools
Newport Independent Schools
Southgate Independent Schools
 The Southgate district does not operate a high school. It has reciprocal agreements with most, if not all, other districts within Boone, Campbell, and Kenton Counties to allow Southgate students to attend high school in those districts. According to a 2015 report by the Legislative Research Commission, the research arm of the Kentucky General Assembly, most Southgate high school students in the 2013–14 school year attended Highlands High School in the Fort Thomas district, with a large minority attending Newport High School in that city's district. Six other Southgate students were attending high school in five other districts.

Daviess County

Daviess County Public Schools
Owensboro Public Schools

Franklin County

Frankfort Independent Schools
Franklin County Public Schools

Fulton County

Fulton County Schools (Kentucky)
Fulton Independent Schools (Kentucky)

Grant County

Grant County Schools
Williamstown Independent Schools

Graves County

Graves County Schools
Mayfield Independent Schools

Greenup County

Greenup County Schools
Raceland-Worthington Independent Schools
Russell Independent Schools

Hardin County

Elizabethtown Independent Schools
Hardin County Schools

Harlan County

Harlan County Public Schools
Harlan Independent Schools

Hart County

Caverna Independent School District
Hart County Schools

Henry County

Eminence Independent Schools
Henry County Schools

Hopkins County

Dawson Springs Independent Schools
Hopkins County Schools

Jefferson County

Anchorage Independent Schools
 The Anchorage district does not operate a high school. It has reciprocal agreements with both Jefferson County Public Schools and Oldham County Schools that allow Anchorage students to apply for admission to any high school in either district.
Jefferson County Public Schools

Johnson County

Johnson County School District
Paintsville Independent School District

Kenton County

Beechwood Independent School District
Covington Independent Public Schools
Erlanger-Elsmere Schools
Kenton County School District
Ludlow Independent Schools

Knox County

Barbourville Independent Schools
Knox County Public Schools

Laurel County

East Bernstadt Independent School
 The East Bernstadt district does not operate a high school. It has a reciprocal agreement with Laurel County Public Schools that allows East Bernstadt students to attend either of the Laurel County district's two high schools.
Laurel County Public Schools

Letcher County

Jenkins Independent Schools
Letcher County Public Schools

Logan County

Logan County Schools
Russellville Independent Schools

Madison County

Berea Independent Schools
Madison County Schools

McCracken County

McCracken County Public Schools
Paducah Public Schools

Mercer County

Burgin Independent Schools
Mercer County Schools

Nelson County

Bardstown City Schools
Nelson County School District

Perry County

Hazard Independent Schools
Perry County Schools

Pike County

Pike County Schools
Pikeville Independent Schools

Pulaski County

Pulaski County Schools
Science Hill Independent Schools
 The Science Hill district does not operate a high school. It has reciprocal agreements with the Pulaski County and Somerset districts that allow Science Hill students to attend high school in either district. According to the aforementioned Legislative Research Commission report, almost all Science Hill students choose to attend the Somerset district's high school.
Somerset Independent Schools

Taylor County

Campbellsville Independent Schools
Taylor County Schools

Warren County

Bowling Green Independent School District
Warren County Public Schools

Whitley County

Corbin Independent School District
Whitley County School District
Williamsburg Independent Schools

Single-District Counties

Adair County Schools
Allen County Schools
Anderson County Schools
Ballard County Schools
Bath County Schools
Bullitt County Public Schools
Butler County Schools (Kentucky)
Caldwell County Schools
Carlisle County Schools
Carroll County Public Schools
Carter County Schools
Casey County Schools
Christian County Public Schools
Clark County Schools
Clay County Schools
Clinton County Schools
Crittenden County Schools
Cumberland County Schools
Edmonson County Schools
Elliott County Schools
Estill County Schools
Fayette County Public Schools
Fleming County Schools
Floyd County Schools
Gallatin County Schools
Garrard County Schools
Grayson County Schools
Green County Schools
Hancock County Schools
Harrison County Schools
Henderson County Schools
Hickman County Schools
Jackson County Public Schools
Jessamine County Schools
Knott County Schools
LaRue County Schools
Lawrence County Schools (Kentucky)
Lee County School District
Leslie County Schools
Lewis County Schools
Lincoln County Schools
Livingston County Schools
Lyon County Schools
Magoffin County Schools
Marion County Schools (Kentucky)
Marshall County Schools
Martin County Schools
Mason County Schools
McCreary County Schools
McLean County Schools
Meade County Schools
Menifee County Schools
Metcalfe County Schools
Monroe County School District
Montgomery County Schools
Morgan County Schools
Muhlenberg County Schools
Nicholas County Schools
Ohio County Schools
Oldham County Schools
Owen County Schools
Owsley County Schools
Pendleton County Schools
Powell County Schools
Robertson County Schools
Rockcastle County Schools
Rowan County Schools
Russell County Schools
Scott County Schools
Shelby County Public Schools 
Simpson County Schools
Spencer County Schools
Todd County Schools
Trigg County Public Schools
Trimble County Schools
Union County Public Schools
Washington County Schools
Wayne County Schools
Webster County Schools
Wolfe County Schools
Woodford County Schools

Footnotes

References

See also
List of high schools in Kentucky
List of middle schools in Kentucky

 
School districts
Kentucky
School districts